The 8th Critics' Choice Awards were presented on January 17, 2003, honoring the finest achievements of 2002 filmmaking.

This ceremony is particularly notable for the moment when Best Actor nominee Robin Williams came up on stage after being called upon by Best Actor co-winner Jack Nicholson, who claimed to be "baked", to assist him with his acceptance speech, culminating in what is considered to be the funniest moment in the awards' history. The acceptance speech was uploaded on YouTube in July 2009; the video currently has over 3 million views on the site.

Top 10 films
(in alphabetical order)

 About Schmidt
 Adaptation
 Catch Me If You Can
 Chicago
 Far from Heaven
 Gangs of New York
 The Hours
 The Lord of the Rings: The Two Towers
 The Pianist
 Road to Perdition

Winners and nominees

Freedom Award
Denzel Washington – Antwone Fisher

Best Picture Made for Television
Door to Door
 Live from Baghdad
 Martin and Lewis

Statistics

References

Broadcast Film Critics Association Awards
2002 film awards